SNL Québec is a Canadian television sketch comedy series, which aired on Télé-Québec in 2014 and 2015.

A French language adaptation of the influential American sketch comedy series Saturday Night Live, the series featured both translated recreations of sketches from the original series and original material written for the Quebec series: the show's first episode included a translation of the iconic Schweddy Balls sketch, and a sketch in the second episode recast the leaders' debate from the 2014 provincial election as an episode of Un dîner presque parfait, the French-language version of Come Dine with Me.

Cast
The show's core cast members were Katherine Levac, Virginie Fortin, Léane Labrèche-Dor, Pier-Luc Funk, Mathieu Quesnel, Guillaume Girard, Mickaël Gouin and Phil Roy. Quesnel served as Les nouvelles SNL anchor for the first two episodes, with Girard and Gouin taking over thereafter.

Production
Initially announced as two standalone comedy specials, several further episodes were produced in 2014 and 2015 as a once-a-month series. Ten episodes, nine originals and a "best-of" compilation of sketches from the earlier episodes, were broadcast overall. As advance publicity for the first two specials, hosts Louis-José Houde and Stéphane Rousseau each recorded segments in which they visited the New York City set of the original Saturday Night Live, including brief interviews with some of SNL's cast.

Cancellation
Télé-Québec announced in early 2015 that due to cutbacks to its budget, the series would not be renewed for another season.

Ici Radio-Canada Télé subsequently announced that it had signed the show's production team and cast to produce a new series, Le nouveau show, for that network.

Episodes

References

External links
SNL Québec

2014 Canadian television series debuts
2015 Canadian television series endings
Saturday Night Live
Television shows filmed in Montreal
2010s Canadian sketch comedy television series
Télé-Québec original programming